Frogging may refer to:

The use of braided frog fasteners
Searching for frogs 
Performing a planche stand
Ripping out knitting
When a page obstructs The Speaker’s view of The Mace in the  Ontario Legislative Assembly

See also

Fragging, deliberate killing or attempted killing by a soldier of a fellow soldier
 
 Frogger (disambiguation)
 Frog (disambiguation)